Maggie Shiu (born February 27, 1965) is a prominent Hong Kong actress.

Career
Her career began in 1985 when she joined Hong Kong TVB. As her career developed, she took on variety of roles in TV series and movies. Hong Kong audiences still remember her first appearance in Jacky Cheung's music video "輕撫你的臉" and her performance as Princess Fragrant in Take Care, Your Highness! (皇上保重). Overseas, Maggie has gained a wider audience with roles as Xiaozhao (小昭) in New Heavenly Sword and Dragon Sabre (倚天屠龍刀), Shek Yi-Ming (石伊明) in Blood of Good and Evil (我本善良), Cin Kiu (展翹) in The Breaking Point (今生無悔), Wai Hoi-Yi (韋海怡) in Conscience (第三類法庭), Anson Man (萬安生) in Healing Hands (妙手仁心), Sylvia Hong (康雅言) in The Gem of Life (珠光寶氣), Officer Kat in PTU, and Mrs. Big D in Election.

Since 2004 Siu has been nominated several times at the Hong Kong Film Awards for Best Supporting Actress: PTU (2004), Breaking News (2005), Election (2006), and Eye in the Sky (2007). In 2007, she was nominated for best supporting actress category in Taiwan's Golden Horse Award for her role as Madam in Eye in the Sky.

Starting 2010 Siu stepped into new path of her career: filming the mainland China TV series. 《宮》 a.k.a. 《宮鎖心玉》 is the first, aired in early 2011, followed by 《歡樂元帥》. In 2011 she filmed her first Malaysia production movie 《老友開心鬼》 (Ghost Buddies).

Filmography

Film

Television series
note: All unmarked TV series are produced by TVB

TV movies
 Call Me Scoundrel (狗紋龍爸爸) (1992) 
 Dead End (死角) (1992) as 琪 Kei
 Edge of Justice (律政皇庭)
 Touches of Love (愛情加油站) (1994)
 This Year I Will Marry (今年我一定嫁得出) (1994)
 Below the Lion Rock - Class of 97 (獅子山下 - 九七同學會) RTHK TV movies as 楊學宜 with David Shiu (邵仲衡) & Choi Kar Lei (蔡嘉利) (1994)
 Those Were The Days (歲月情真) (1995) as 玲 Ling
 盛世戀  RTHK's short movie (1997)
 Unbearable Height (鐵翼驚情) (2001) as 空姐 Ada
 Tactical Unit - The Code  《機動部隊》之 《警例》 飾 張佩億 Sgt. May Cheung Pui Yi (#26316) [DVD released on 27 Feb 2009]
 Tactical Unit - No Way Out  《機動部隊》之 《絕路》 飾 張佩億 Sgt. May Cheung Pui Yi (#26316)  [DVD released on 13 March 2009]
 Tactical Unit - Human Nature  《機動部隊》之 《人性》 飾 張佩億 Sgt. May Cheung Pui Yi (#26316) [DVD released on 27 March 2009]
 Tactical Unit - Partners  《機動部隊》之 《伙伴》 飾 張佩億 Sgt. May Cheung Pui Yi (#26316) [DVD to be released in 2009]
 A World Without Wall  《沒有牆的世界》 － 《一千光年外的自由》 飾 秋瑩 RTHK's short TV movie (7 March 2010)
 ICAC 2011 《廉政行動2011》 之 《盲目》 RTHK's production; aired on TVB 5 Nov 2011.
 Equal Opportunities  《非常平等任務》之《少數》  飾 秋瑩 RTHK's short TV movie (12 March 2013)

Music videos
Jacky Cheung's  (輕撫你的臉) &  (情已逝) (1985)
George Lam's  (愛到發燒) (1985)
George Lam's  (十分十二吋) (1985)
Alan Tam's  (愛念) (1986)
Ken Choi's  (愛不是遊戲) (1986)
 Terrence Choi's 《閃出每分光》 1992 ---  (with other TVB artists)

Radio Dramas
 RTHK (原野) as 金子 with Deric Wan and Jacky Cheung  (1995)
 RTHK (查某人) with Andy Lau and Lam San San (林珊珊) (1997)

Stage Dramas
 (花心大丈夫) with Chow Yun-fat, Sean Lau and Fu Yuk Cing (符玉晶) (1996)

References

External links
 Maggie Shiu's sina weibo 邵美琪新浪微博
 Maggieshiu International fans club -美麗琪跡-邵美琪國際影迷聯盟
 
 HK cinemagic

1965 births
Living people
Hong Kong film actresses
Hong Kong television actresses
TVB veteran actors
20th-century Hong Kong actresses
21st-century Hong Kong actresses
People from Zengcheng